Grey Street may refer to:

"Grey Street" (song), a 2002 Dave Matthews Band song from The Lillywhite Sessions and from the studio album Busted Stuff
Grey Street, Melbourne, a street in the red-light district of Melbourne, Australia
Grey Street, Brisbane, the main shopping and dining esplanade of Brisbane's South Bank cultural precinct
Grey Street, Newcastle, a street in Newcastle upon Tyne, England, known for its Georgian architecture
Grey Street (Road), one of the oldest roads in then Calcutta (now Kolkata)